The President of the Presidency of the Central Committee of the League of Communists of Yugoslavia, formerly the General Secretary of the Central Committee of the Communist Party of Yugoslavia, was the leader of the Central Committee of the League of Communists of Yugoslavia. 

As chairman of the Central Committee, the President was the de facto leader of Socialist Federal Republic of Yugoslavia. The longest serving officeholder was Josip Broz Tito, serving from 1939 to his death in 1980.

Collective leadership (1919–1934)

|-style="text-align:center;"
! colspan=8| Political Secretaries (1919–1921)

|-style="text-align:center;"
! colspan=8| Organizational Secretary (1919–1921)

|-style="text-align:center;"
| colspan=8| 
|-style="text-align:center;"
! colspan=8| Alternative Central Party Leadership (1921–1922)

|-style="text-align:center;"
| colspan=8| A split in the leadership led to the formation of the Executive Committee in Emigration in opposition to the leadership:
|-style="text-align:center;"
! colspan=8| Executive Committee of the Communist Party in Emigration (1921–1922)

|-style="text-align:center;"
| colspan=8| The factions were reunited at the First State Conference held in Vienna, Austria in July 1922.
|-style="text-align:center;"
! colspan=8| Secretaries (1922–1926)

|-style="text-align:center;"
! colspan=8| Political Secretary (1926–1928)

|-style="text-align:center;"
! colspan=8| Organizational Secretary (1926–1928)

|-style="text-align:center;"
| colspan=8| The Central Committee was deposed in April 1928 by the Comintern and replaced by a temporary leadership:
|-style="text-align:center;"
! colspan=8| Temporary Leadership (1928)

|-style="text-align:center;"
! colspan=8| Political Secretary (1928–1930)

|-style="text-align:center;"
! colspan=8| Organizational Secretary (1928–1929)

|-style="text-align:center;"
| colspan=8| Since 1930 the party leadership was in exile in Vienna, Austria with no contact to the country until 1934.

Officeholders (1934–1990)

Political Secretary of the Central Committee (1934–1936)

General Secretary of the Central Committee (1936–1964)

President of the Presidency (1964–1990)

Notes

See also
League of Communists of Yugoslavia
Socialist Federal Republic of Yugoslavia
List of heads of state of Yugoslavia
List of deputy heads of state of Yugoslavia
Presidency of Yugoslavia
Prime Minister of Yugoslavia
Deputy Prime Minister of Yugoslavia
List of presidents of the Federal Assembly of Yugoslavia

References

League of Communists of Yugoslavia
1919 establishments in Yugoslavia
1990 disestablishments in Yugoslavia
Yugoslavia